Couratari guianensis, the fine-leaf wadara, cachimbo caspi, cachimbo, capa de tabaco, coco cabuyo, or tauari, is a species of woody plant in the family Lecythidaceae. It is found in Brazil, Colombia, Costa Rica, French Guiana, Guyana, Panama, Peru, Suriname, and Venezuela. It is threatened by habitat loss.

References

guianensis
Neotropical realm flora
Vulnerable plants
Taxonomy articles created by Polbot